The Martinique giant ameiva (Pholidoscelis major) was a species of lizard in the family Teiidae.
It is believed to have been endemic to Martinique, though at least one scholar disputes this, instead placing it on Les Iles de la Petite Terre within the Guadeloupean archipelago.  It is known only from museum specimens collected by early European explorers.  Its extinction may have been caused by a hurricane, or through the introduction of predatory species to the island.

References

External links
Pholidoscelis major at the Encyclopedia of Life
Pholidoscelis major at the Reptile Database

Pholidoscelis
Reptile extinctions since 1500
Extinct reptiles
 Reptiles described in 1839
 Taxa named by André Marie Constant Duméril
 Taxa named by Gabriel Bibron
 Taxonomy articles created by Polbot